The Albree Pigeon-Fraser was the first pursuit aircraft project for the United States Government.

Development 
George Albree was awarded the first US pursuit aircraft contract in 1917.  The aircraft was designed with a flat bottom airfoil and the aft fuselage was hinged to act like an elevator.

Operational history 
The first aircraft flew in December 1917, however it crashed on its first flight, killing the pilot. The second aircraft never flew and was destroyed during structural testing. The third aircraft was not completed before the program was cancelled for being "too old-fashioned, unreliable, and slow".

Survivor 
The incomplete third aircraft was put into storage and in 1961 was acquired by the Old Rhinebeck Aerodrome where it is currently on display.

Specifications

References 

1910s United States experimental aircraft
Rotary-engined aircraft
Single-engined tractor aircraft
Aircraft first flown in 1917
High-wing aircraft